Washington Boulevard Historic District is a multi-block area of downtown Detroit, Michigan. It consists of structures facing Washington Boulevard between State and Clifford Streets. In 1982, it was added to the National Register of Historic Places. It includes the Book-Cadillac Hotel, the Book Tower, the Industrial Building, and Detroit City Apartments among other architecturally significant buildings. Washington Boulevard is one of the city's main boulevards and part of Augustus Woodward's 1807-design for the city. Because Woodward's plan was never completed, the boulevard contains a sharp curve south of Michigan Avenue where it was connected to an existing street.

The street was broadened and ornamented in the early part of the 20th century. The development was inspired by the City Beautiful movement and financed by J. Burgess Book Jr. and designed by Louis Kamper. It was to resemble New York's Fifth Avenue and European boulevards. A sculpture lined park between two one-way streets decorated a shopping district and upscale residential neighborhood Edward H. Bennett, a well known master planner, turned Washington Boulevard into a Beaux-Arts streetscape.

In the late 1970s, Washington Boulevard was redesigned with an urban pedestrian mall that included new sculptures and an amphitheater. It has since been restored to its original plan.

Buildings
This list below shows the information on the buildings located along Washington Boulevard. This list starts at the Detroit River (south end), and heads northbound, terminating at Grand Circus Park.

Gallery

See also

References and further reading

External links

City of Detroit Planning and Development Department. Washington Boulevard Historic District
 Google Maps location

Downtown Detroit
Historic districts in Detroit
Boulevards in the United States
Streets in Michigan
1901 establishments in Michigan
Historic districts on the National Register of Historic Places in Michigan
National Register of Historic Places in Detroit
History of Detroit
Neighborhoods in Detroit